"Can-Utility and the Coastliners" is the fourth song on Genesis' fourth album, Foxtrot, released in 1972. "Can-Utility and the Coastliners", written mostly by guitarist Steve Hackett with bass player Mike Rutherford and keyboardist Tony Banks, is based on the legend of King Cnut of England, Norway, and Denmark, who supposedly ordered the seas to retreat to mock the sycophancy of his followers. Steve Hackett wrote the lyrics. 

An early, longer version of the song found its way into pre-album live sets (as heard on certain bootleg recordings); known as "Bye Bye Johnny" or "Rock My Baby", it featured an extended instrumental section in which the Mellotron string sound dominated.

Personnel 
 Peter Gabriel – lead vocals, tambourine, oboe
 Phil Collins – drums, finger cymbals, backing vocals
 Steve Hackett – electric and 12-string acoustic guitars
 Mike Rutherford – 12-string acoustic guitar, bass guitar, Dewtron "Mister Bassman" bass pedal synthesizer
 Tony Banks – Mellotron, Hammond organ

See also
 Cultural depictions of Cnut the Great

References 

Genesis (band) songs
1972 songs
Cnut the Great
Songs written by Tony Banks (musician)
Songs written by Phil Collins
Songs written by Peter Gabriel
Songs written by Steve Hackett
Songs written by Mike Rutherford
Songs about kings